The Australian Recording Industry Association holds the ARIA Music Awards each year to recognise excellence, innovation and achievement in Australian music. The awards have industry judged and highest selling categories, and since 2010 public vote categories. Award nominees and winners, excluding those for sales and public voted categories, are selected by an academy of judges from all sectors of the music industry, including retail, radio and TV, journalists, record companies and previous winners. Australian Idol contestants have been nominated for 105 ARIA Awards since 2004, with 24 highest selling nominations, 33 nominations in publicly voted categories and 48 industry judged nominations. However, up until 2009 the nominations were mainly in the Highest Selling categories, with only five industry judged nominations being given. Since 2009 industry judged nominations have come more frequently for some Idol contestants. To date there have been 11 wins in sales and publicly voted categories, and in 2013 Season One winner Guy Sebastian and Season Four runner up Jessica Mauboy became the first Idol contestants to win industry voted ARIA Awards, Sebastian for Best Pop Release and Mauboy for Best Female Artist.

Sebastian has received the most ARIA nominations with 34 including seven wins. Mauboy has had 28 nominations including two wins, and Season Five runner up Matt Corby has received ten nominations including two wins. Mauboy has the most industry judged ARIA nominations with 15 and Sebastian has received 14. Corby has six industry voted nominations, Season Four contestant Lisa Mitchell four, and Season One contestant Joel Turner three. Season Four winner Damien Leith has been nominated twice in industry judged categories, and Noll once.

The public vote categories were introduced in 2010, and are generally determined by the ten highest selling releases during the eligibility period, with the winner decided by the public. They replaced the Highest Selling Single and Album awards that year. All 2010 ARIA Award nominees were also automatically shortlisted for Most Popular Australian Artist, with the final five and winner chosen by public vote. In 2011 the ten nominees for Most Popular Australian Artist were the acts who had the  highest selling albums or singles during the eligibility period. A Most Popular Live Performer category was also introduced in 2011. It had no original nominee list, and any Australian musician who had performed live in Australia during the eligibility period could be voted for. From 2012 this category was changed to Best Live Act and the nominees were chosen by ARIA, with public vote only deciding the winner. A Best Video category was also introduced with the same voting system. Also in 2012 the highest selling single and album categories were again removed. The peer voted Single of the Year was also removed, and replaced with a publicly voted Song of the Year award. Nominees for this award are the ten highest selling Australian single releases during the eligibility period. Artists are only allowed to be nominated for one song, even if they have more than one in the top ten, and songs must have been released as singles during the eligibility period.

References

External links 
 ARIA Music Awards official site

Australian Idol contestants
Australian Idol
Australian Idol contestants
Australian television-related lists